Statistics of Nemzeti Bajnokság I for the 1910–11 season.

Overview
It was contested by 10 teams, and Ferencvárosi TC won the championship.

League standings

Results

References
Hungary - List of final tables (RSSSF)

1910-11
1910–11 in Hungarian football
1910–11 in European association football leagues